Nyasa may refer to:

Nyasa (ritual), concept in Hinduism
Nyasa (lake), lake in Africa also known as Lake Malawi
Nyasa languages, group of Bantu languages
Nyasa people

See also
Nyassa